The Kamenica Tumulus is an important archaeological site in Kamenicë, Korçë County, Albania.  The site includes a museum dedicated to the prehistory of Albania and of the surrounding region.

History of the Tumulus Excavation

Looters heavily damaged the site during the 1997-1999 period following the 1997 rebellion in Albania, which was followed by an interdisciplinary work performed in the 2000-2002 period by the Albanian Institute of Archaeology, the Albanian Rescue Archaeology Unit, and the Museum of Korçë and aimed at excavation campaigns.

The end of the excavations showed that the Tumulus of Kamenica represents the largest burial monument of its kind in relation to 200 tumuli excavated in Albania and neighboring Balkan countries.

The central grave, which dates back to the Bronze Age (13th century BC) is surrounded by two large concentric circles unlike any other tumuli discovered in Albania. The tumulus grew to 40 graves in the Late Bronze Age (1200-1050 BC) and to 200 in the Early Iron Age (1050-750 BC). The tumulus grew further until the 7th century BC until it took an elliptical shape with dimensions of 70 m X 50 m. During the excavation campaign more than 400 graves, 440 skeletons, and 3,500 archaeological objects were found.

Conservation and presentation work
In 2007 a stone bridge and a protecting wall in the southern part were built, followed by a canal dug in order to drain the waters. In addition green courtyards surround the tumulus and lime paths direct the visitors to the tumulus and to the museum.

Museum and cultural activities
The museum is a portico style building, made of wood. It includes panels with the history of the excavation. Of particular interest is the illustration of the surgery of a male cranium, performed in the 6th century BC, which shows the advanced medical knowledge of the community that lived in the area at that time. The museum also includes two replica graves with the original remains.

The site organizes several cultural activities, in particular classical musical concerts. In addition, on September 29 is Albania's National Cultural Heritage Day, which has been celebrated every year recently in the site.

Recent discoveries
Recently archaeologists have also found in one of the graves the skeleton of a pregnant woman and her unborn child dating to 3000 BC.

See also
List of national parks in Albania
Tourism in Albania

References

Sources

External links
Kamenica Tumulus Official Website

Archaeological sites in Albania
Former populated places in the Balkans
Ruins in Albania
Buildings and structures in Korçë County
Archaeology of Illyria
A
Archaeological museums in Albania
Tourist attractions in Korçë County